Philip L. Brooks (born December 30, 1937) is an American former football coach.  He was the head football coach at Alma College in Alma, Michigan, from 1971 to 1990.  He is the author of the book Forward Pass:  The Play that Saved Football. He also authored "The Fields of Greed," a fiction genre in 2017.

Early life and playing career
Brooks earned first-team All-State honors in football in 1954 as a running back.  Corunna football teams were 17–1 his last two years.  Brooks graduated from Corunna High School in Corunna, Michigan in 1955.
Brooks earned a B.A. degree from Albion College in 1960, and an M.S. Degree from Oklahoma State University in 1968.

Coaching career
Brooks was the head football coach at Alma College in Alma, Michigan.  He held that position for 20 seasons, from 1971 until 1990.  His coaching record at Alma was 96–86.

Head coaching record

College

References

1937 births
Living people
Albion Britons football players
Alma Scots football coaches
Eastern Michigan Eagles football coaches
High school football coaches in Michigan
People from Owosso, Michigan